The 2020 Marrakesh ePrix was a Formula E electric car race held at Circuit International Automobile Moulay El Hassan in Marrakesh on 29 February 2020. The race was a replacement for the 2020 Hong Kong ePrix, which was cancelled due to pro-democracy protests.

Report

Background 
On 15 June 2019, Formula E announced the provisional calendar for the 2019–20 season, in which Marrakesh was not included. The final calendar, which was revealed in October, saw multiple date changes with Marrakesh coming in to replace Hong Kong. Marrakesh would also host the third annual rookie test a day after the event, where each team got to nominate two drivers who have not officially competed in the series.

Schedule changes 
Free Practice 1 was moved to Friday afternoon due low visibility issues from sunrise during the first practice session in last year's event.  The 2020 race held 47 days later on the calendar (February 29) compared to the 2019 race (January 12), an earlier sunrise and later sunset in late February compared to early January.

Rookie Test 

The traditional rookie test took place the day after the race.

Classification

Qualifying 

Notes:
 – Robin Frijns and Neel Jani broke the 110% rule as their qualifying laps were cancelled due to them not respecting the homologated throttle pedal map. The Stewards gave them permission to start the race from the back of the grid.
 – Mitch Evans did not enter his qualifying lap before the time had run out. The Stewards gave him permission to start the race from the back of the grid.

Race 
Drivers who scored points are denoted in bold.

Notes:
 – Pole position.
 – Fastest in group stage.
 – Fastest lap.

Standings after the race

Drivers' Championship standings

Teams' Championship standings

 Notes: Only the top five positions are included for both sets of standings.

Footnotes

References 

|- style="text-align:center"
|width="35%"|Previous race:2020 Mexico City ePrix
|width="30%"|FIA Formula E Championship2019–20 season
|width="35%"|Next race:2020 Berlin ePrix
|- style="text-align:center"
|width="35%"|Previous race:2019 Marrakesh ePrix
|width="30%"|Marrakesh ePrix
|width="35%"|Next race:2022 Marrakesh ePrix
|- style="text-align:center"

Marrakesh ePrix
Marrakesh ePrix
21st century in Marrakesh
Marrakesh ePrix
Marrakesh ePrix